Güven Kıraç (born 5 April 1960) is a Turkish actor. He won the IFFI Best Actor Award (Male) at the 41st International Film Festival of India.

Biography
Kıraç was born on 5 April 1960 in Istanbul, Turkey. He studied theater at the conservatory of Mimar Sinan University.

He is of Abkhaz descent.

Filmography 

  Kavşak
  Zor Adam
  Tövbe
  Sünnet Davası
  Babba
 Masumiyet - Yusuf
 Salkım Hanımın Taneleri - Bekir
  Lalelide Bir Azize - Aziz
  Duruşma - Cavit
 Abdülhamit Düşerken 
 Duvara Karşı - Şeref
 Gönül Yarası - Memet
 Anlat İstanbul - Mimi
 Takva - Rauf
 Kebab Connection - Mehmet - İbo's father
 Sınav 
 Yaşamın Kıyısında 
 The Net 2.0
 Kirpi - Tahir Yaman
 Gemide - 1. Adam
 Hacivat Karagöz Neden Öldürüldü? - Pervane
 Özür Dilerim (2013) Selim

References

 Biyografi.info - Biography of Güven Kıraç 
 Biyografi.net - Biography of Güven Kıraç

External links

1960 births
Living people
Turkish male film actors
Turkish male television actors
Turkish people of Abkhazian descent
IFFI Best Actor (Male) winners
Male actors from Istanbul